Pumicestone is an electoral district of the Legislative Assembly in the Australian state of Queensland.

The district was first created for the 2001 state election. Located in the corridor between Brisbane and the Sunshine Coast, it includes the urbanised areas of Bribie Island, as well as parts of Caboolture. It is named after the Pumicestone Channel, the strait which divides Bribie Island from the mainland.

Members for Pumicestone

Election results

References

External links
 

Pumicestone